Abdul Rachman (born 30 January 1988 in Penajam North Paser) is an Indonesian professional footballer who plays as a left-back for Liga 1 club Borneo Samarinda.

Club career

Borneo
He was signed for Borneo to play in Liga 1 in the 2017 season. Abdul Rachman made his debut on 29 April 2017 in a match against Persegres Gresik United. On 2 May 2017, Rachman scored his first goal for Borneo against Persipura Jayapura at the Mandala Stadium, Jayapura.

PSM Makassar
In 2021, Abdul Rachman signed a one-year contract with Indonesian Liga 1 club PSM Makassar. Rachman made his debut on 5 September 2021 as a substitute in a match against Arema. On 18 November 2021, Rachman scored his first goal for PSM against PSS Sleman at the Manahan Stadium, Surakarta.

Bhayangkara
Abdul Rachman was signed for Bhayangkara to play in Liga 1 in the 2022–23 season. He made his league debut on 31 July 2022 in a match against Persik Kediri at the Brawijaya Stadium, Kediri.

Career statistics

International

Honours

International
Indonesia
AFF Championship runner-up: 2016

References

External links
 

1988 births
Living people
People from Penajam North Paser Regency
Sportspeople from East Kalimantan
Indonesian footballers
Liga 1 (Indonesia) players
Indonesian Premier Division players
Bontang F.C. players
Persiba Balikpapan players
Dewa United F.C. players
Borneo F.C. players
PSM Makassar players
Bhayangkara F.C. players
Indonesia international footballers
Association football defenders